Nashville International Airport  is a public/military airport in the southeastern section of Nashville, Tennessee, United States. Established in 1937, its original name was Berry Field, from which its ICAO and IATA identifiers are derived. The current terminal was built in 1987, and the airport took its current name in 1988.

The airport is served by 30 airlines, 26 passenger and 4 cargo-only (and of which 7 are foreign airlines) and has 585 daily arriving and departing flights with nonstop flights to 101 airports in North America and Europe. Joint Base Berry Field, formerly Berry Field Air National Guard Base is located at Nashville International Airport.  The base is home to the 118th Wing and the 1/230th Air Cavalry Squadron Tennessee Army National Guard.

History

Origins
 Nashville's first airport was Hampton Field, which operated until 1921. It was replaced by Blackwood Field in the Hermitage community, which operated between 1921 and 1928. The first airlines to serve Nashville, American Airlines and Eastern Air Lines, flew out of Sky Harbor Airport in nearby Rutherford County.

By 1935 the need for an airport larger and closer to the city than Sky Harbor Airport was realized and a citizens' committee was organized by Mayor Hilary Ewing Howse to choose a location.  A  plot along Dixie Parkway (now Murfreesboro Road) composed of four farms was selected, and construction began in 1936 as one of the first major Works Progress Administration projects in the area. The airport was dedicated on November 1, 1936, as Berry Field, named after Col. Harry S. Berry, the Tennessee administrator for the Works Progress Administration. It opened in June 1937 with much fanfare, including parades, an air show, and an aerial bombardment display by the 105th Aero Squadron, which was based at the field. Passenger service began in mid-July through American Airlines and Eastern Airlines, both of which operated Douglas DC-3s. The new airport had three asphalt runways, a three-story passenger terminal, a control tower, two hangars and a beacon, and was built at a cost of $1.2 million. In its first year Berry Field served 189,000 passengers.

During World War II, the airfield was requisitioned by the United States Army Air Forces Air Transport Command as the headquarters for the 4th Ferrying Command for movement of new aircraft overseas. At the end of the war, the airport was returned to the control of the city, with a number of facilities remaining for support of the tenant unit of the Tennessee National Guard.

The airport had been enlarged by the military during World War II, but in 1958 the City Aviation Department started planning to expand and modernize the airport. In 1961, a new  terminal opened off of Briley Parkway, west of runway 2L. 1961 also saw the first scheduled jets at Berry Field, American Airlines 720/720Bs. For the first time more than half a million people passed through the airport when the six airlines that served Nashville carried 532,790 passengers. In 1962 Nashville became the first municipal airport in the United States with a public reading room when the Nashville Public Library opened a branch inside the terminal.

Hub years
By the 1970s the airport was again in need of expansion and modernization. In 1973 the newly created Metropolitan Nashville Airport Authority (MNAA) finalized a plan for the long-term growth of the airport; the plan included a new terminal and a new parallel runway across Donelson Pike to increase capacity by reducing time between takeoffs and landings.

In the early 1980s the MNAA commissioned Robert Lamb Hart, in association with the firm of Gresham, Smith and Partners, to design a modern terminal; construction began in 1984 and was completed in 1987. It had three main concourses and a smaller commuter concourse radiating from a distinctive three-story atrium. An international wing was built in Concourse A; the airport was renamed Nashville International Airport/Berry Field.  It is now rare to see the "Berry Field" portion used, but the airport's IATA code (BNA) is short for Berry Field Nashville, and the military facilities at the airport are still commonly known by this name.  In 1989 a new parallel runway (2R/20L) was opened for use.

American Airlines announced in 1985 that it would establish a hub at Nashville, and it officially opened in 1986. The hub was intended to compete with Delta Air Lines, Eastern Air Lines and Piedmont Airlines for north–south traffic in the eastern United States. Besides providing nonstop flights to many cities in the U.S. and Canada, American also operated a transatlantic flight from Nashville to London. The American hub was touted as a selling point in bringing companies such as Nissan and Saturn Corporation to the Nashville area. Nonetheless, the hub operated at a loss even during its heyday in the early 1990s, like the similarly sized hub American had at Raleigh/Durham.

American's service peaked in 1993 with 265 daily departures to 79 cities, after which flights were gradually scaled back until the hub closed in December 1995. American cited the aftermath of the early 1990s recession and the lack of local passengers as reasons for the closure.

Recent history

In the aftermath of the hub closure, Southwest Airlines gradually filled the void by subleasing American's gates and seizing a majority of the Nashville market. Southwest continues to dominate the airport to this day.

In 2002 Embraer Aircraft Maintenance Services (EAMS) selected Nashville as the location for its Regional Airline Support Facility, which was built on the site of the demolished 1961 terminal building.

In October 2006 the Nashville Metropolitan Airport Authority started an extensive renovation of the terminal building, designed by Architectural Alliance of Minneapolis and Thomas, Miller & Partners, PLLC of Nashville, the first since the terminal opened 19 years prior. Phase one of the project involved updating and expanding food and vending services, improving flight information systems, and construction of a new consolidated security checkpoint for all terminals. Phase one was completed in 2009. Phase two of the project involved the expansion of the ticketing and check-in areas, the construction and renovation of bathrooms, and the renovation of the baggage claim areas. Completion of the second phase of the renovation project was completed in 2011. In addition to the terminal renovation and expansion, the renovations included expanding parking and a new rental car facility. The renovated terminal was named the Robert C. H. Mathews Jr. Terminal in honor of a MNAA board chair in 2011.

In addition to passenger amenities in the terminal and parking areas, the renovations included improvements to the airport's infrastructure.  The largest project was the complete demolition and rebuilding of Runway 2L/20R, which was completed in August 2010.  In addition to the rebuilding of Runway 2L/20R, Runway 2C/20C was closed from September through December 2010 for pavement and concrete rehabilitation.  BNA's  of tarmac were also rehabilitated during this project after being funded entirely by American Recovery and Reinvestment Act allotments.

In August 2017, British Airways announced nonstop service between Nashville and London, which began on May 4, 2018. This marked the return of transatlantic service at BNA for the first time since 1995, when American ended their London flight.

Future
To accommodate growth at BNA, the Metro Nashville Airport Authority has commenced "BNA Vision," a $1.5 billion overhaul and expansion of many of the airport's facilities. The upgrades consist of the following:

the "revival and expansion" of Concourse D, adding six gates to the airport
the renovation and expansion of the central terminal area
a new international arrivals facility, including six new international gates and a new Customs and Border Protection area
construction of a satellite concourse
addition of multiple new parking garages
construction of an on-airport hotel

BNA Vision is scheduled to be completed in late 2023. 

In 2021, the MNAA announced a new plan called "New Horizon," proposing to expand Concourses A and D with additional gates, bringing the airport to 69 total gates. Under this $1.4 billion plan, the airport is expected to expand Concourses A and D, construct a new air freight building, make terminal roadway improvements, and make baggage system handling improvements. Construction on the project is expected to begin in late 2023, starting with construction on the expansion of Concourse D. The entire New Horizons project is expected to be completed in late 2028.

Facilities

Terminal

The airport has one terminal with four concourses and a total of 41 gates. All non pre–cleared international flights are currently processed in Concourse A.

Concourse A contains 7 gates.
Concourse B contains 10 gates.
Concourse C contains 18 gates.
Concourse D contains 6 gates.

Entertainment 
In keeping with Nashville's tradition as "Music City," the airport has long featured live music at a number of its restaurants (past security). , there are six such performance areas, with a combined total of over 700 shows each year. One of the oldest honky-tonks in the city, Tootsie's Orchid Lounge, has a location in Concourse C.

Carpet 

For roughly a decade, the airport's terminal floors were carpeted with a unique pattern, with swirling patterns layered on top of shades of brown and other neutral colors. An (unofficial) fan Instagram account for the carpet started in 2018 became a significant success, amassing over 28,000 followers  and arguably helping establish the carpet as a fan favorite among the public. In August 2020, despite a petition for the airport to keep the carpet, the airport announced it planned to replace the carpet mostly with terrazzo tiles but also, in some places, with a differently patterned carpet. For some time after the announcement, the airport's online store sold doormats made of unused tiles of the old carpet.

Ground transportation
The airport is served by I-40, which has an eastbound exit and westbound entrance ramp to the terminal road. The airport can also be accessed via the Donelson Pike exit. Taxis and ride share pick up in the Ground Transportation Center on Level 1 of Terminal Garage 2.

Nashville International Airport could eventually be connected to downtown Nashville via a light rail line, and the ongoing expansion allows for a connection to be made in the plaza on top of the parking garages.

Military facilities
Berry Field Air National Guard Base (ANGB) was located on the premises of Nashville International Airport.  Since 1937 it hosted the 118th Airlift Wing (AW).  Berry Field faced the removal of its flying mission with the BRAC 2005 recommendation to realign its assets to other units.  It initially averted this fate by taking on a new role as the C-130 International Training Center. The C-130s assigned to the unit were eventually transferred and the 118th AW became the 118th Wing, supporting unmanned aircraft operations.

Approximately 1,500 personnel are assigned to both Headquarters, Tennessee Air National Guard and to the 118 Air Wing at Berry Air National Guard Base. Approximately 400 are full-time Active Guard and Reserve (AGR) and Air Reserve Technician (ART) personnel, augmented by approximately 1100 traditional part-time air guardsmen.

The last C-130 left Nashville in December 2012 and on April 17, 2015, the first UH-60 Blackhawk helicopters belonging to the Tennessee Army National Guard's 1/230th Air Cavalry Squadron relocated to what is now known as Joint Base Berry Field from Army Aviation Support Facility #1 in Smyrna, Tennessee.

Airlines and destinations

Passenger

Cargo

Statistics

Top destinations

Airline market share

Airport traffic

Accidents and incidents
 On January 1, 1947, a privately operated Douglas DC-2 on final approach crashed into a house less than a mile from the airport. There were no fatalities reported, however sixteen passengers and crew on the aircraft and two persons on the ground were injured. 
 On September 28, 1963, an Eastern Air Lines Douglas DC-7 crashed on landing after the aircraft's nose gear collapsed. All 45 passengers and crew survived.
 On May 31, 1985, a Gulfstream I crashed immediately after takeoff due to failure of the left engine. Both people on board were killed.
 On January 29, 1996, a United States Navy F-14 Tomcat fighter crashed shortly after takeoff.  The jet struck a housing development and erupted into a fireball, killing the pilot and four individuals on the ground.
 On September 9, 1999, a TWA McDonnell Douglas DC-9 suffered a landing gear collapse after a hard touchdown.  All 46 passengers and crew survived.
 On October 29, 2013, a Cessna 172R departing from Windsor International Airport in Windsor, Ontario, Canada deviated from its declared destination of Pelee Island Airport, flew south to Nashville, and circled the airport for two hours before crashing on Runway 2C and bursting into flames, killing the sole occupant. The burned wreckage went unnoticed for nearly six hours, as it had been obscured by dense fog, before being spotted by another general aviation aircraft. The NTSB investigation of the crash determined that the pilot, Michael Callan, was intoxicated at the time of the crash. Additionally, he falsely listed singer Taylor Swift as his next of kin, and had written letters with signs of stalking to her, leading investigators to believe that he flew to Nashville to stalk her.
On December 15, 2015, Southwest Airlines Flight 31, a Boeing 737-300, from Houston, Texas, exited the taxiway and rolled into a ditch shortly after arriving into Nashville as the airplane was entering the terminal ramp. All 138 passengers and crew were safely evacuated from the plane and bussed into the airport.
On December 27, 2019, Southwest Airlines Flight 975, a Boeing 737-700 from Pittsburgh, Pennsylvania, suffered a bird strike while on approach to the airport, damaging the wing and horizontal stabilizer. The aircraft was able to land without injuries and was later returned to service following repairs.

See also
Tennessee World War II Army Airfields

References

External links

Nashville International Airport, official site
Nashville International (BNA) at Tennessee DOT airport directory
Aerial image as of March 1997  from USGS The National Map

Airports in Tennessee
Airports established in 1937
Transportation buildings and structures in Nashville, Tennessee
1937 establishments in Tennessee